Jacques Rousseau (born 10 March 1951 in Basse-Terre, Guadeloupe), is a French athlete. In 2006, he was living in Guadeloupe.

Achievements 
 Personal best in the long jump: 8.26 meters in 1976 (French record)
 European champion long jumper in 1978
 European indoor long-jump champion in 1975 and 1976
 French champion long jumper in 1975, 1976 and 1977
 French indoor long-jump champion in 1973, 1975 and 1976
 He participated in two Olympics, in 1972 at Munich (tenth) and in 1976 at Montréal (fourth)
 European junior vice-champion d'Europe in long jump in 1970
 Selected several times for the junior and senior French teams, he also won a European cup for long jump and 4 by 4 relays. Along with his team, the Racing Club of France, he was French champion of the  4 × 400 m relay.
 A versatile athlete, he also has turned in the following performances:
47.5 in the 400 meter
20.7 in the 200 meter
10.3 in the 100 meter
2 meters in the high jump

References

This is a translation of the corresponding page in the French Wikipedia.

External links

 

Living people
French male long jumpers
1951 births
Olympic athletes of France
French people of Guadeloupean descent
European Athletics Championships medalists
Athletes (track and field) at the 1972 Summer Olympics
Athletes (track and field) at the 1976 Summer Olympics